Jean-François Coulomme (born 1 April 1966) is a French politician from La France Insoumise (NUPES). He was elected member of the National Assembly in Savoie's 4th constituency in the 2022 French legislative election.

Early life 
Coulomme was born in Paris and is the grandson of Spanish refugees who fled the Spanish Civil War.

See also 

 List of deputies of the 16th National Assembly of France

References 

Living people
1991 births
Members of Parliament for Savoie
Deputies of the 16th National Assembly of the French Fifth Republic
La France Insoumise politicians
21st-century French politicians
French people of Spanish descent